Sarah Jane McLaughlin (born 3 June 1991) is an association football player who represented New Zealand at international level.

She was a member of the New Zealand squad in the inaugural FIFA U-17 Women's World Cup, playing all three group games; a 0–1 loss to Canada, a 1–2 loss to Denmark, and a 1–3 loss to Colombia.

McLaughlin also represented New Zealand at the 2008 FIFA U-20 Women's World Cup in Chile, again playing all three group games; a 2–3 loss to Nigeria, a 4–3 win over hosts Chile, and scored New Zealand's goal against England before England equalised late in injury time to eliminate New Zealand from the tournament.  In 2010, she represented New Zealand at the 2010 FIFA U-20 Women's World Cup, playing in two group games.

McLaughlin made her senior Football Ferns debut as a substitute in a 0–6 loss to China on 10 January 2009.

References

External links

1991 births
Living people
New Zealand women's international footballers
New Zealand women's association footballers
2011 FIFA Women's World Cup players
Adelaide United FC (A-League Women) players
A-League Women players
Women's association football forwards